This was the first edition of the tournament.

Robert Galloway and Nathaniel Lammons won the title after defeating Sander Gillé and Joran Vliegen 7–5, 6–4 in the final.

Seeds

Draw

References

External links
 Main draw

Oracle Challenger Series - New Haven - Men's Doubles